John Ring (13 November 1900 – 10 November 1984) was a Welsh dual-code international rugby union, and professional rugby league footballer who played in the 1910s, 1920s  and 1930s.

Playing career

International honours
Johnny Ring won a cap for Wales (RU) while at Aberavon in 1921 against England, won 6 caps for Wales (RL) in 1925–1930 while at Wigan, and won caps for England (RL) while at Wigan in 1924 against Australia, and in 1926 against New Zealand.

Championship final appearances
Johnny Ring played , i.e. number 2, and scored 3-tries in Wigan's 22-10 victory over Warrington in the Championship Final during the 1925–26 season at Knowsley Road, St. Helens on Saturday 8 May 1926.

Challenge Cup Final appearances
Johnny Ring played , i.e. number 2, in Wigan's 13-2 victory over Dewsbury in the 1929 Challenge Cup Final during the 1928-29 season at Wembley Stadium, London on Saturday 4 May 1929.

County Cup Final appearances
Johnny Ring played , i.e. number 5, and scored a try in Wigan's 20–2 victory over Leigh in the 1922–23 Lancashire County Cup Final during the 1922–23 season at The Willows, Salford on Saturday 25 November 1922, played , i.e. number 2, and scored 3-tries in the 11-15 defeat by Swinton in the 1925–26 Lancashire County Cup Final during the 1925–26 season at The Cliff, Broughton on Wednesday 9 December 1925, played  in the 5-4 victory over Widnes in the 1928–29 Lancashire County Cup Final during the 1928–29 season at The Willows, Salford on Saturday 24 November 1928, and played  and scored a try in the 3-18 defeat by St Helens Recs in the 1930–31 Lancashire County Cup Final during the 1930–31 season at Station Road, Swinton on Saturday 29 November 1930.

Career Records
Johnny Ring set Wigan's club record for most tries in a season with 62 scored during the 1925–26 Northern Rugby Football League season. The 368-tries he scored during his career at Wigan was also a club record, until extended to 478-tries by Billy Boston.

He is one of less than twenty-five Welshmen to have scored more than 1000-points in their rugby league career.

References

External links
!Great Britain Statistics at englandrl.co.uk (statistics currently missing due to not having appeared for both Great Britain, and England)
Statistics at wigan.rlfans.com
Convert To Reference Statistics at en.espn.co.uk (RU)
Convert To Reference Statistics at wru.co.uk (RU)

1900 births
1984 deaths
Aberavon RFC players
Dual-code rugby internationals
England national rugby league team players
Rochdale Hornets players
Rugby league players from Port Talbot
Rugby league wingers
Rugby union players from Port Talbot
Rugby union wings
Wales international rugby union players
Wales national rugby league team players
Welsh rugby league players
Welsh rugby union players
Wigan Warriors players